Saint Lucia is a sovereign island country in the eastern Caribbean Sea on the boundary with the Atlantic Ocean. Part of the Lesser Antilles, it is located north/northeast of the island of Saint Vincent, northwest of Barbados and south of Martinique. It covers a land area of 617 km2 (238.23 sq mi) and reported a population of 165,595 in the 2010 census. Its capital is Castries.

Saint Lucia has been able to attract foreign business and investment, especially in its offshore banking and tourism industries, which is Saint Lucia's main source of revenue. The manufacturing sector is the most diverse in the Eastern Caribbean area, and the government is trying to revitalise the banana industry. Despite negative growth in 2011, economic fundamentals remain solid, and GDP growth should recover in the future.

Notable firms 
This list includes notable companies with primary headquarters located in the country. The industry and sector follow the Industry Classification Benchmark taxonomy. Organizations which have ceased operations are included and noted as defunct.

References

 
Saint Lucia
Saint Lucia
Companies